Senator Huber may refer to:

Henry Huber (1869–1933), Wisconsin State Senate
Robert J. Huber (1922–2001), Michigan State Senate